Transgenerational may refer to:

 Heredity
 Transgenerational epigenetic inheritance
 Epigenome
 Epigenetics (section Transgenerational)
 Allele

 Lamarckism (section Transgenerational epigenetic inheritance)
 Addiction (section Transgenerational epigenetic inheritance)
 Addiction vulnerability (section Transgenerational epigenetic inheritance)

 Effects of nuclear explosions on human health (section Transgenerational genetic damage)

 Transgenerational trauma
 Transgenerational stress inheritance
 Childhood trauma (section Transgenerational effects)
 Behavioural responses to stress (section Transgenerational responses)

 Generation
 Generation gap

 Design
 Product design
 Architecture
 Transgenerational design